Melnikovo is a rural locality (a settlement) on Karelian Isthmus, in Priozersky District of Leningrad Oblast. Before the Winter War and Continuation War it was the administrative center of the Räisälä municipality of Finland.

External links

Rural localities in Leningrad Oblast
Karelian Isthmus